DAV College may refer to
 Dayanand Anglo-Vedic Schools System
or one of these colleges:
 BBK DAV College for Women, Amritsar
 D.A.V. College (Lahore), Ambala City
 D.A.V. College Lucknow
 D.A.V. College, Koraput
 DAV College, Chandigarh
 DAV College, Kanpur
 DAV Institute of Engineering and Technology (DAVIET), Jalandhar
 Dayanand College, Ajmer
 GAIL D.A.V. Public School, Gail Gaon, Dibiyapur, Auraiya
 Pannalal Girdharlal Dayanand Anglo Vedic College, Delhi